The 11th National Spelling Bee was held in Washington, D.C. at the National Museum on May 28, 1935. Scripps-Howard would not sponsor the Bee until 1941. 

The 20 spellers had a banquet at the Hamilton Hotel on the evening of May 27 before proceeding to the National Museum the next day for the competition.

The winner was Clara Mohler, 13, of Ohio, correctly spelling the word interning, which had been misspelled by the prior speller, followed by intelligible. Paul McCusker, 13, of Niagara Falls, New York took second, followed by Bruce Ackerman of Illinois in third.

Mohler is the third (out of five as of 2020) speller from the Akron area and sponsored by the Akron Beacon Journal to win the Bee, after Dean Lucas in 1927, and Alma Roach in 1933.  After Mohler, Jean Chappelear won in 1948 and William Kerek won in 1964. 

Mohler later obtained a degree in foreign languages from Ohio University and was an educator for over 40 years. She died in 2013.

References

Scripps National Spelling Bee competitions
1935 in education
1935 in Washington, D.C.
May 1935 events